Melvin (Mel) Stephens Jr. is an American economist and Professor of Economics and Public Policy in the Economics Department and the Ford School of Public Policy at the University of Michigan.  He is also a Research Associate of the National Bureau of Economic Research, and a member of the Academic Research Council of the U.S. Consumer Financial Protection Bureau. His research is in the areas of displaced workers, household consumption, and retirement decisions. He has been nominated as an officer of the American Economic Association.

Selected works 

 Stephens, Jr, Melvin. "Worker displacement and the added worker effect." Journal of Labor Economics 20, no. 3 (2002): 504–537.
 Charles, Kerwin Kofi, and Melvin Stephens, Jr. "Job displacement, disability, and divorce." Journal of Labor Economics 22, no. 2 (2004): 489–522.
 Stephens Jr, Melvin. "" 3rd of tha month": Do social security recipients smooth consumption between checks?." American Economic Review 93, no. 1 (2003): 406-422.
 Haider, Steven J., and Melvin Stephens Jr. "Is there a retirement-consumption puzzle? Evidence using subjective retirement expectations." The review of economics and statistics 89, no. 2 (2007): 247–264.
 Stephens Jr, Melvin. "The long-run consumption effects of earnings shocks." Review of Economics and Statistics 83, no. 1 (2001): 28–36.

References 

African-American economists
Living people
Labor economists
University of Maryland, College Park alumni
Gerald R. Ford School of Public Policy faculty
21st-century American economists
Year of birth missing (living people)
21st-century African-American people